

Shakey's V-League

Champions by Season

2004–2016

The UST Tigresses have the most number of championships (six), followed by the DLSU Lady Spikers and NU Lady Bulldogs with (three). The Adamson Lady Falcons, Ateneo Lady Eagles, Philippine Army Lady Troopers, Cagayan Valley Lady Rising Suns, PLDT Home Ultera Fast Hitters and Pocari Sweat Lady Warriors with (two) championships each. The San Sebastian Lady Stags, Vietsovpetro (VIE), Sandugo-San Sebastian, FEU Lady Tamaraws each have (one) championship.

Champions by Team

Premier Volleyball League

Champions by Season

References